Gilles Biron (born 13 April 1995) is a French sprinter. He competed in the men's 4 × 400 metres relay event at the 2020 Summer Olympics.

References

External links
 

1995 births
Living people
French male sprinters
Athletes (track and field) at the 2020 Summer Olympics
Olympic athletes of France
People from Schœlcher
European Athletics Championships medalists
21st-century French people